Sundad is a former mining town and populated place situated in the far west of Maricopa County, Arizona, United States, along the border of Yuma County. It is located north of Agua Caliente and east of Sacation Flats.

The Bureau of Land Management consider Sundad as a historic site.

History 
Sudad was initially a mining town, and in the 1920s was the proposed site of a sanatorium. 

In 1970, R. Agin owned the Sundad Copper Mine, located on Bureau of Land Management land at GPS  33.1819, -113.23190. The mine produced both silver and copper from surface and underground mining activities.

A 500 feet deep wildcat oil well was once drilled near Sundad.

References

External links
 Sundad – ghosttowns.com
 Sundad – Ghost Town of the Month at azghosttowns.com
 Off Road - Sundad

Ghost towns in Arizona
Populated places in Maricopa County, Arizona